Pound Puppies was a toyline.

Pound Puppies may also refer to:
 Pound Puppies (film), a 1985 television special
 Pound Puppies (1986 TV series), an animated TV series that ran from 1986–1987
 Pound Puppies and the Legend of Big Paw, a 1988 animated movie that was based on the animated TV series
 Pound Puppies (2010 TV series), an animated TV series that ran from 2010–2013

See also
List of Pound Puppies characters